Members of the New South Wales Legislative Council who served from 1910 to 1913 were appointed for life by the Governor on the advice of the Premier. This list includes members between the election on 14 October 1910 and the election on 6 December 1913. The President was Sir Francis Suttor.

See also
McGowen ministry
Holman Labor ministry

Notes

References

 

Members of New South Wales parliaments by term
20th-century Australian politicians